"The Song of the Marines" is a song composed by Harry Warren with lyrics by Al Dubin. It was featured in the 1937 Warner Bros. film, The Singing Marine where it was sung by actor Dick Powell.

Later, Warner Bros. Cartoons used the song in several shorts, including the Porky Pig short Porky the Gob (1938). A shortened version (omitting the lines "It may be Shanghai, farewell and goodbye") was sung several times in the Daffy Duck cartoon Conrad the Sailor (1942) and several opening bars of it in Duck Amuck (1953), plus the Sylvester and Tweety cartoon Snow Business (1953)

In 1962, Dick Powell, star of The Singing Marine, reprised the song in a cameo appearance in the Ensign O'Toole episode "Operation Benefit", a TV series owned by his production company, Four Star Television. It was one of his final filmed appearances.

References

Songs about sailors
Songs about soldiers
Works about the United States Navy
1937 songs
Songs written for films
American military marches
Songs with music by Harry Warren
Songs with lyrics by Al Dubin